Adi Ali Bakit may refer to two villages in Eritrea:

Adi Ali Bakit, Anseba in Hagaz District of Anseba 
Adi Ali Bakit, Gash-Barka in Dghe District of Gash-Barka